John Burns is an entomologist, curator of Lepidoptera and professor at Department of Entomology, Smithsonian Institution.

Academic background
Burns has completed his BS at Johns Hopkins University & MS, PhD at University of California, Berkeley.

Fields of study
Burns is an expert in Lepidoptera (skipper butterflies), evolutionary biology and poetry. He has discovered a new species of skipper butterflies and named it as Pseudodrephalys sohni found at Brazil.

Publications
Some of his notable publications are as follows:

 DNA barcodes distinguish species of tropical Lepidoptera 2006
 Pan-neotropical genus Venada (Hesperiidae: Pyrginae) is not monotypic: Four new species occur on one volcano in the Area de Conservacion Guanacaste 2005
 What's in a name? Lepidoptera: Hesperiidae: Pyrginae: Telemiades Hubner 1819: new combinations Telemiades corbulo (Stoll) and Telemiades oiclus (Mabille) 2005
 Wedding biodiversity inventory of a large and complex Lepidoptera fauna with DNA barcoding 2005
 Ten species in one: DNA barcoding reveals cryptic species in the neotropical skipper butterfly Astraptes fulgerator 2004
 Pseydodrephalys: A New Genus Comprising Three Showy, Neotropical Species 1998

References
http://entomology.si.edu/StaffPages/BurnsJ.htm

Year of birth missing (living people)
Living people
Johns Hopkins University alumni
University of California, Berkeley alumni
American curators
Smithsonian Institution people
Date of birth missing (living people)
21st-century American zoologists
American lepidopterists